Marie McLaughlin (born 2 November 1954) is a Scottish operatic soprano.

A light lyric soprano, McLaughlin is noted for her performances as Susanna and Marcellina (Le nozze di Figaro), Zerlina (Don Giovanni), Despina (Cosi fan tutte), Norina (Don Pasquale), Marzelline (Fidelio), Nannetta (Falstaff), Micaëla (Carmen), Tytania (A Midsummer Night's Dream), Zdenka (Arabella), and Hanna Glawari (The Merry Widow).

Career
Born in Hamilton, South Lanarkshire, Scotland, she studied in Glasgow and at the London Opera Centre, making her debut as Susanna in Le nozze di Figaro. After singing with Scottish Opera and the Welsh National Opera, she then appeared with the English National Opera from 1978, and at the Royal Opera House in London from 1980. Her international career has included guest roles at the Hamburg State Opera, Deutsche Oper Berlin, Paris Opéra, Bavarian State Opera, and the Metropolitan Opera of New York, Vienna State Opera and the Salzburg Festival. In 2013 she appeared in the world premieres of The Perfect American by Philip Glass (Madrid) and A Harlot's Progress by Iain Bell (Vienna).

Selected recordings
Ivy Smith in On the Town conducted by Michael Tilson Thomas (Deutsche Grammophon CD, DGG 437 516–2, 1993)
Despina in Così fan tutte conducted by James Levine (Deutsche Grammophon CD, DGG 4238972 1989)
Micaëla in Carmen conducted by Bernard Haitink (Kultur Video DVD, KUL 2843)
Susanna in Le nozze di Figaro conducted by Claudio Abbado (Sony Classics DVD).
Zerlina in Don Giovanni conducted by Neville Marriner (Philips CD)
Zdenka in Arabella conducted by Christian Thielemann (Deutsche Grammophon DVD)
Violetta in La Traviata conducted by Bernard Haitink (Image Entertainment DVD)
Soloist in Suor Angelica conducted by Richard Bonynge (Decca CD, DEC 2894582182)
Soloist in Mozart Requiem conducted by Leonard Bernstein (Deutsche Grammophon CD, DGG 4273532 1989)
Schubert Lieder with Graham Johnson (Hyperion Schubert Edition 13, CD, HYP 33013, 1992)
Richard Strauss Lieder with Graham Johnson (Hyperion CD, HYP 55202, 2005)

References

Sources
Warrack, John and West, Ewan (1992), The Oxford Dictionary of Opera, 782 pages,

External links
 Hyperion Records Artist page featuring Marie McLaughlin
 Interview with Marie McLaughlin, October 17, 1991

Living people
1954 births
Scottish operatic sopranos
Scottish people of Irish descent
20th-century Scottish women opera singers
21st-century Scottish women opera singers
People from Hamilton, South Lanarkshire